Barren Run is a  long 2nd order tributary to Jacobs Creek in Westmoreland County, Pennsylvania.

Variant names
According to the Geographic Names Information System, it has also been known historically as:
Barnes Run

Course
Barren Run rises about 0.5 miles west-northwest of Mendon, Pennsylvania, and then flows southwest to join Jacobs Creek about 0.5 miles southeast of Jacobs Creek.

Watershed
Barren Run drains  of area, receives about 41.4 in/year of precipitation, has a wetness index of 340.38, and is about 58% forested.

References

 
Tributaries of the Ohio River
Rivers of Pennsylvania
Rivers of Westmoreland County, Pennsylvania
Allegheny Plateau